is a Japanese singer and voice actress. She was a member of the Japanese girl idol group SKE48, which she joined as a third-generation trainee in November 2009, before being promoted to Team KII. She graduated from the group on March 29, 2013. Hata is currently a member of Pastel Palettes, a unit of the media franchise BanG Dream!.

Career 
In 2012, Hata along with six other AKB48 group members, one fellow SKE48 group member, and one NMB48 group member joined the unit No Name. No Name released their debut single, "Kibō ni Tsuite", as the title song for the anime AKB0048. The selected members became the starring voice actresses for the anime, in which Hata voiced Suzuko Kanzaki.

At the AKB48 27th Single Senbatsu Election in 2012, Hata placed 25. From April 2013, following her graduation from SKE48, she began attending a voice acting school. She is currently affiliated with Mausu Promotion.

In 2016, Hata voiced in the Shimajiro film Shimajiro in Bookland as Kurorin. 
In 2017, Hata joined the media franchise BanG Dream!; she portrays Eve Wakamiya, keyboardist for the idol band Pastel Palettes.

Appearances

Singles

SKE48
 "Pareo wa Emerald" (July 27, 2011)
 "Okey Dokey" (November 11, 2011)
 "Kataomoi Finally" (January 25, 2012)
 "Aishite-love-ru!" (May 16, 2012)
 "Kiss datte Hidarikiki" (September 19, 2012)
 "Choco no Dorei" (January 30, 2013)

AKB48

B-side(s)
 "Flying Get" (December 7, 2011)

 "Gingham Check"

 "Eien Pressure" (December 5, 2012)

Video games
 Azur Lane as Fiji
 BanG Dream! Girls Band Party! as Eve Wakamiya
 Caravan Stories as Almimi
 Fire Emblem: Three Houses as Marianne von Edmund
 Revived Witch as La Crima

Films
 Shimajiro in Bookland as Kurorin.

References

External links
 Official blog 

1988 births
Living people
SKE48 members
Voice actresses from Osaka
Japanese idols
Japanese voice actresses
Musicians from Osaka
21st-century Japanese actresses
21st-century Japanese singers
21st-century Japanese women singers
Mausu Promotion voice actors